Ravindra Nath Tripathi is an Indian politician and a member of 17th Legislative Assembly, Uttar Pradesh of India. He represents the Bhadohi constituency of Uttar Pradesh. He is a member of the Bharatiya Janata Party.

Rape case 
Tripathi, his five sons and a nephew were booked in a case of gang rape on 19 February 2020. The FIR against him and others was lodged at Bhadohi Kotwali police station on the basis of a complaint filed by the 40-year-old woman survivor.

Political career
Ravindra Nath Tripathi has been a member of the 17th Legislative Assembly of Uttar Pradesh. Since 2017, he has represented the Bhadohi constituency and is a member of the BJP. Ravindra Nath Tripathi won the Uttar Pradesh assembly elections held in 2017 by defeating his close contestant Zahid Baig with a margin of 1,105 votes.

References

 

Year of birth missing (living people)
Living people
Bharatiya Janata Party politicians from Uttar Pradesh
Uttar Pradesh MLAs 2017–2022